The 1970 Cincinnati Bearcats football team represented University of Cincinnati during the 1970 NCAA University Division football season. The Bearcats, led by head coach Ray Callahan, participated as independent and played their home games at Nippert Stadium.

Schedule

References

Game films
 1970 Cincinnati - Miami (Oh) Football Game Film, Reel 1.  UC in white and visitors on scoreboard in their home stadium.
 1970 Cincinnati - Miami (Oh) Football Game Film, Reel 2.  UC in white and visitors on scoreboard in their home stadium.

Cincinnati
Cincinnati Bearcats football seasons
Cincinnati Bearcats football